The 2018 Women's Centrobasket Championship was held in the city of Manatí, Puerto Rico from August 20 to 24, 2018. The tournament was scheduled to include eight teams, including the Virgin Islands, but they withdrew.

The teams are divided into two pools of four teams each; each pool plays a round-robin. The top two teams in each pool advance to the championship round, consisting of semifinals, a bronze medal game, and a gold medal game. Semifinalists also qualify for the 2019 FIBA Women's AmeriCup.

Group stage

Pool A

Pool B

Final round

Final standings

References

External links
 Official website

Centrobasket Women
2018–19 in North American basketball
2018 in women's basketball
International women's basketball competitions hosted by Puerto Rico
2018 in Central American sport
2018 in Caribbean sport
August 2018 sports events in North America